The New Zealand Speedway Grand Prix is a motorcycle speedway race part of the Speedway Grand Prix. The event is held at the Western Springs Stadium in Auckland. Western Springs is a permanent speedway venue which generally caters to car racing such as Sprintcars and Midgets, though it has also hosted Motorcycle speedway on many occasions, including 15 times as host of the New Zealand Individual Speedway Championship.

At  in length, Western Springs, which hosted the opening round of the SGP from 2012–2014, was one of the longest tracks used in the 25-year history of the series.

The Grand Prix of New Zealand has been dropped from the 2015 Speedway Grand Prix series.

Winners

See also

New Zealand
Motorsport competitions in New Zealand